Kanita Suma (born 26 July 2001), also known mononymously as Kanita, is an Albanian singer from North Macedonia.

Life and career 

Kanita Suma was born on 26 July 2001 into an Albanian family in the city of Skopje, Macedonia. Suma rose to prominence as she auditioned for the second season of X Factor Albania in 2012 finishing in the fourth place. She continued her musical career and participated in Kënga Magjike on two occasions, in 2014 and 2018. In October 2019, the Albanian broadcaster, Radio Televizioni Shqiptar (RTSH), announced that Suma would compete in the 58th edition of Festivali i Këngës, the country's national selection competition for the Eurovision Song Contest 2020, with the song "Ankth". In the semi-finals, she failed to qualify for the grand final of Festivali i Këngës. In January 2020, "Fllad" was released and went on to reach number seventy eight in Albania.

Discography

Singles

As lead artist

As featured artist

References 

2001 births
21st-century Albanian women singers
Albanian-language singers
Albanian musicians from North Macedonia
Albanian pop singers
Festivali i Këngës contestants
Living people
21st-century Macedonian women singers
Macedonian pop singers
Musicians from Skopje